Fred Espenak is a retired emeritus American astrophysicist. He worked at the Goddard Space Flight Center. He is best known for his work on eclipse predictions.

He became interested in astronomy when he was 7–8 years old, and had his first telescope when he was around 9–10 years old. Espenak earned a bachelor's degree in physics from Wagner College, Staten Island, where he worked in the planetarium.  His master's degree is from the University of Toledo, based on studies he did at Kitt Peak Observatory of eruptive and flare stars among red dwarfs.

He was employed at Goddard Space Flight Center, where he used infrared spectrometers to measure the atmospheres of planets in the Solar System. He provided NASA's eclipse bulletins since 1978. He is the author of several canonical works on eclipse predictions, such as the Fifty Year Canon of Solar Eclipses: 1986–2035 and Fifty Year Canon of Lunar Eclipses: 1986–2035, both of which are standard references on eclipses. The first eclipse he saw was the solar eclipse of March 7, 1970, which sparked his interest in eclipses, and he has since seen over 20 eclipses.

Together with Jean Meeus, he published the Five Millennium Canon of Solar Eclipses in 2006, which covers all types of solar eclipses (partial, total, annular, or hybrid) from 2000 BCE to AD 3000, and the Five Millennium Canon of Lunar Eclipses in 2009, which lists all lunar eclipses (penumbral, partial, or total) in that time span. Later, he published the more compact Thousand Year Canon of Lunar Eclipses 1501 to 2500, the Thousand Year Canon of Solar Eclipses 1501 to 2500, and the 21st Century Canon of Solar Eclipses. He is also a co-author (with Mark Littmann and Ken Willcoxof) of Totality: Eclipses of the Sun.

He was the co-investigator of an atmospheric experiment flown on Space Shuttle Discovery.

He is also known as "Mr. Eclipse." He gives public lectures on eclipses and astrophotophy. Astronomical photographs taken by Espenak have been published in National Geographic, Newsweek, Nature, New Scientist, and  magazines.

He met Patricia Totten while in India in 1995. They married in 2006.

He retired in 2009. Asteroid 14120 Espenak was named in his honor in 2003.

See also

 Saros (astronomy)

References

External links
 

American astrophysicists
Goddard Space Flight Center people
Living people
People from Staten Island
Wagner College alumni
University of Toledo alumni
Scientists from New York (state)
1953 births